Ou Chuliang (born 26 August 1968 in Guangzhou, Guangdong) is an assistant coach and former Chinese international football goalkeeper. As a player, he was goalkeeper for Guangdong Hongyuan, Shanghai Shenhua, Yunnan Hongta and Chongqing Qiche while internationally he was a participant of the Chinese football team that took part in the 2002 FIFA World Cup.

Club career 
Ou started his football career with Guangdong Hongyuan F.C. during the 1988 football league season. With them Ou would see Guangdong establish themselves as a professional football club in the Chinese league system and also help them come second in the 1993 league season. Guangdong, however were relegated in the 1997 league season and Ou Chuliang was transferred to Shanghai Shenhua at the beginning of the 1998 league season. With Shanghai Ou Chuliang would make an immediate impact by helping them come second within the league as well as aiding them in their Chinese FA Cup win. Yunnan Hongta who were a newly promoted football team wanted to take Ou Chuliang in their attempt to establish themselves within the top tier and Ou would help them do this by quickly establish himself in the team by playing in 26 league games and aiding Yunnan Hongta avoid relegation. Qu would spend several more seasons with Yunnan before being transferred to Chongqing Lifan F.C. in 2004 eventually ending his career with them.

International career
Ou would make his international debut in a friendly match against Canada on 2 April 1992 in a 5–2 defeat. Despite the defeat, Ou would be given the chance to play in several other friendlies which were enough to be called up to the Chinese squad that took part in the 1992 AFC Asian Cup where he played understudy to Fu Yubin. Ou would rise to prominence when he replaced Fu Yubin as the first choice goalkeeper for China in the 1996 AFC Asian Cup by starting the first game of the tournament against Uzbekistan. After a disappointing 1998 FIFA World Cup qualification (AFC), Ou found himself increasingly replaced by Jiang Jin and was replaced as first choice goalkeeper in the 2000 AFC Asian Cup. When China qualified for the FIFA World Cup Jiang Jin remained the first choice goalkeeper throughout the tournament.

Management career
After he retired he would move to the United Kingdom and Germany to study for and achieve a FIFA coaching licence. When he returned in 2005 he was offered an assistant goalkeeping position for the Chinese U-23 football team to help them prepare for the Football at the 2008 Summer Olympics. Ou would only stay for a short period before he returned to Shanghai Shenhua to become their goalkeeping coach. By 2008 he was offered another assistant position, this time with the Chinese senior team as their new goalkeeping coach.

Personal life
Ou Chuliang's grandfather Ou Shounian was a general of the National Revolutionary Army of the Republic of China.

Honours

Player

Shanghai Shenhua

Chinese FA Cup: 1998

References

External links

2002 World Cup profile at BBC.co.uk

1968 births
Living people
2002 FIFA World Cup players
China international footballers
1992 AFC Asian Cup players
1996 AFC Asian Cup players
2000 AFC Asian Cup players
Chinese footballers
Footballers from Guangzhou
Association football goalkeepers
Guangdong Winnerway F.C. players
Shanghai Shenhua F.C. players
Yunnan Hongta players
Chongqing Liangjiang Athletic F.C. players
Chinese football managers
Asian Games silver medalists for China
Medalists at the 1994 Asian Games
Asian Games medalists in football
Footballers at the 1994 Asian Games